Fredelsloh is a village in Lower Saxony in Germany close to the town of Northeim. The town is historically agricultural, but today derives much income from its traditional pottery shops. The village is centred on a very large church, Klosterkirche Fredelsloh, which was formerly a mediaeval nunnery. The von Ohlen family historically owned much of the land in and around the village, and still has a strong presence in the area.

Further reading 
Fritz Both: 850 Jahre Fredelsloh. Chronik. Ortsrat Fredelsloh (Hrsg.). Moringen 1982
Fritz Both: Die Klosterkirche St. Blasii und Marien in Fredelsloh (Kleine Kunstführer für Niedersachsen, Volume 22). Göttingen 1982
Horst Gramatzki: Das Stift Fredelsloh von der Gründung bis zum Erlöschen seines Konvents. 2001
Gerda Engelbracht: Das "Töpferdorf Fredelsloh". Ein Dorf zwischen Töpfertradition und Tourismus. Magisterarbeit. Göttingen 1981
 Petra Lönne, Johannes Klett-Drechsel & Sonja M.-A. König: "Die mittelalterliche Töpfereiwüstung Bengerode bei Fredelsloh, Ldkr. Northeim.". In: Mamoun Fansa, Frank Both, Henning Haßmann (Herausgeber): Archäologie|Land|Niedersachsen. 400 000 Jahre Geschichte. Landesmuseum für Natur und Mensch, Oldenburg 2004 = Lizenzausgabe für die Wissenschaftliche Buchgesellschaft. pp. 264–266.

Villages in Lower Saxony